Shoaib Ibrahim (born 20 June 1987) is an Indian actor who works in Hindi television. He is known for playing Prem Bhardwaj in Colors TV's popular show Sasural Simar Ka. In 2017 he participated in Star Plus's dance reality show Nach Baliye 8.

Personal life
Ibrahim married Dipika Kakar, his co-star from Sasural Simar Ka, on 22 February 2018 in Maudaha.

Career

Ibrahim began his television career as Karan Pratap on Imagine TV's Rehna Hai Teri Palkon Ki Chhaon Mein in 2009.

In 2011, Ibrahim was seen in a lead role as Prem Bharadwaj in Sasural Simar Ka on Colors TV. In 2013, he left and then got replaced by Dheeraj Dhoopar.

Following a three years long break, in 2017, Ibrahim resumed his TV journey and played dual roles of Abhimanyu and Aditya Singh Rathore on Sphere Origins's production Koi Laut Ke Aaya Hai via Star Plus opposite Surbhi Jyoti. In the same year, he participated in the dance reality show Nach Baliye 8 on Star Plus along with his wife Dipika Kakar.

In March 2018, he participated in Box Cricket League 3. He was next seen in Zee TV's Jeet Gayi Toh Piya Morey where he played the role of Varun Babbar opposite Yesha Rughani. From 2018 to 2019, Ibrahim starred in Ishq Mein Marjawan on Colors TV as Abhimanyu.

In January 2019, he made his debut into Bollywood industry with the movie Battalion 609 as Kamraj Mishra.

After a gap of 3 years, he made a comeback in July 2022 with Star Bharat's Ajooni as Rajveer Singh Bagga.

Filmography

Films

Television

Special appearances

Music videos

References

External links

 
 

1987 births
Living people
Male actors from Bhopal
Indian male soap opera actors
Indian male television actors
Male actors in Hindi television
21st-century Indian male actors